University of Bengkulu is a public university in Bengkulu, Bengkulu, Indonesia. It was established on 24 April 1982. Its current rector is Ridwan Nurazi.

Schools
The university has 7 faculties:
 School of Agriculture
 School of Social and Political Sciences
 School of Economics
 School of Teacher 
 School of Law
 School of Mathematics and Natural Sciences
 School of Engineering

References

External links
 Official site

bengkulu (city)
Universities in Bengkulu
Universities in Indonesia
Indonesian state universities
Educational institutions established in 1982
1982 establishments in Indonesia